Chytridium elegans is a species of fungi in the family Chytridiaceae.

References

External links 

 
 Chytridium elegans at MycoBank

Chytridiomycota
Fungi described in 1888